PSV Eindhoven Superleague Formula team was the racing team of PSV Eindhoven, a football team that competes in the Netherlands in the Eredivisie. The PSV Eindhoven racing team competed in the Superleague Formula. It had been operated by Azerti Motorsport for all seasons.

2008 season
In the 2008 Superleague Formula season PSV Eindhoven finished overall in 2nd place in the standings. They were 76 points behind eventual series winners Beijing Guoan. Yelmer Buurman was the driver in the car for all the races.

2009 season
For the 2009 Superleague Formula season, Dominick Muermans was confirmed as the driver.

Record
(key)

2008

2009
Super Final results in 2009 did not count for points towards the main championship.

2010

References

External links
 PSV Eindhoven Superleague Formula team minisite
 Official PSV Eindhoven football club website

PSV Eindhoven
Superleague Formula club teams
2008 establishments in the Netherlands